The 2018 Volvo Car Open was a women's tennis event on the 2018 WTA Tour. It took place between April 2 – 8, 2018 and was the 46th edition of the Charleston Open tournament and a Premier level tournament. The event took place at the Family Circle Tennis Center, on Daniel Island, Charleston, United States. It was the only event of the clay court season played on green clay.

Points and prize money

Point distribution

Prize money

Singles main draw entrants

Seeds 

1 Rankings as of March 19, 2018.

Other entrants 
The following players received wildcards into the main draw:
  Sara Errani
  Bethanie Mattek-Sands

The following players received entry from the qualifying draw:
  Francesca Di Lorenzo 
  Caroline Dolehide
  Georgina García Pérez 
  Vera Lapko 
  Claire Liu
  Sílvia Soler Espinosa 
  Fanny Stollár 
  Maryna Zanevska

The following player received entry as a lucky loser:
  Dayana Yastremska

Withdrawals
Before the tournament
  Catherine Bellis → replaced by  Kristie Ahn
  Kaia Kanepi → replaced by  Polona Hercog
  Ana Konjuh → replaced by  Andrea Petkovic
  Petra Martić → replaced by  Sofia Kenin
  Shelby Rogers → replaced by  Jennifer Brady
  Lucie Šafářová → replaced by  Taylor Townsend
  Maria Sakkari → replaced by  Bernarda Pera
  Sloane Stephens → replaced by  Dayana Yastremska 
  Barbora Strýcová → replaced by  Natalia Vikhlyantseva

Retirements
  Beatriz Haddad Maia
  Vera Lapko

Doubles main draw entrants

Seeds 

1 Rankings as of March 19, 2018.

Other entrants 
The following pairs received wildcards into the doubles main draw:
  Lara Arruabarrena /  Sara Errani 
  Misaki Doi /  Christina McHale

Champions

Singles 

  Kiki Bertens def.  Julia Görges, 6–2, 6–1

Doubles 

  Alla Kudryavtseva /  Katarina Srebotnik def.  Andreja Klepač /  María José Martínez Sánchez, 6–3, 6–3

References

External links 
 

2018 WTA Tour
2018 in American tennis
2018 Volvo Car Open
2018 in sports in South Carolina
April 2018 sports events in the United States